The Battle of the Timberlands is an annual football game between the Southern Arkansas University Muleriders and the University of Arkansas–Monticello Boll Weevils. The game became known as the "Battle of the Timberlands" in 2012 when a traveling trophy for the contest was created (both schools are located in southern Arkansas, which has a large forest products industry).

The rivalry between the two schools dates back to 1913. Both schools are currently members of the Great American Conference. Through the 97 games played, SAU leads the series 59–37–1.

Game results

* – In 1999, Arkansas–Monticello initially won the game but later had to forfeit due to the use of an ineligible player.

† – In 2006, the game was played at Panther Stadium on the campus of Magnolia High School.

See also  
 List of NCAA college football rivalry games

References

College football rivalries in the United States
Arkansas–Monticello Boll Weevils football
Southern Arkansas Muleriders football
1913 establishments in Arkansas